Zan Perrion is a Canadian author, motivational speaker, and pickup artist based in Bucharest, Romania. Perrion gives seminars and workshops about seduction and dating, through his company Alabaster Communications Inc. He was the author of the book, The Alabaster Girl.

Reception
Neil Strauss, author of The Game: Penetrating the Secret Society of Pickup Artists, called Perrion "the undisputed heavyweight of the genre" of "cocky funny", a particular approach to attracting women.

References

Further reading
  Heremans, Tom (3 October 2009). "Do women and they will love you." De Standaard.
  (21 September 2008). Aufreiß-Seminar "Tear-off seminar: flamethrower and ovens." Süddeutsche Zeitung.

External links
 

Living people
Canadian motivational writers
Life coaches
Canadian motivational speakers
Pickup artists
Year of birth missing (living people)